is a city in eastern Shizuoka Prefecture, Japan. , the city had an estimated population of 245,015 in 106,087 households, and a population density of 1,000 persons per km2. Fuji is the third largest city in terms of population in Shizuoka Prefecture, trailing Hamamatsu and Shizuoka.

Geography
Located on the banks of the Fuji River, most of the city of Fuji enjoys good views of Mount Fuji, part of whose summit is within the city borders. The city is bordered to the south by Suruga Bay on the Pacific Ocean.

Surrounding municipalities
Shizuoka Prefecture
Shimizu-ku, Shizuoka
Fujinomiya
Numazu
Susono
Gotemba
Nagaizumi

Demographics
Per Japanese census data, the population of Fuji has grown rapidly over the past 50 years.

Climate
The city has a climate characterized by hot and humid summers, and relatively mild winters (Köppen climate classification Cfa).

History 
In the Edo period, the Tōkaidō passed through the area that is now Fuji, with a post station at Yoshiwara-juku. During the Edo period, the area was mostly tenryō territory under direct control of the Tokugawa shogunate. With the establishment of the modern municipalities system of the early Meiji period in 1889, the area was reorganized into the town of Yoshiwara (吉原町) and the villages of Shimada (島田村) Denbō (伝法村), Imaizumi (今泉村), Motoyoshiwara (元吉原村), Sudo (須津村), Yoshinaga (吉永村), Harada (原田村), Ōbuchi (大淵村), Kajima (加島村), Tagoura (田子浦村), Iwamatsu (岩松村), and Takaoka (鷹岡村) within Fuji District.

Kajima became the town of Fuji on August 1, 1929. Neighboring Takaoka was elevated to town status on January 1, 1933. Shimada merged into Yoshiwara in 1940, Denbō in 1941, and Imaizumi in 1942. Yoshiwara was elevated to city status on April 1, 1948, the city expanded through annexation of Motoyoshiwara, Sudo, Yoshinaga, and Harada villages in 1955 and Ōbuchi in 1956.

Tagoura and Iwamatsu merged with Fuji to form the city of Fuji on March 31, 1954. The city expanded through annexation of neighboring Ukijima and San area from Hara, Suntō District in 1956.

On November 1, 1966, Fuji and Yoshiwara merged with Takaoka to form the new city of Fuji, which attained the status of a Special City on April 1, 2001 with greater autonomy from the central government.

On November 1, 2008, the town of Fujikawa (from Ihara District) was merged with Fuji.

Government
Fuji has a mayor-council form of government with a directly elected mayor and a unicameral city legislature of 32 members. The city contributes five members to the Shizuoka Prefectural Assembly. In terms of national politics, the city is divided between Shizuoka 3rd District and Shizuoka 4th District in the lower house of the Japanese Diet.

Economy
Fuji is one of the major industrial centers of Shizuoka Prefecture, and the city has hosted numerous paper factories including Nippon Paper Industries (former Daishowa Paper Industries) and Oji Paper Company since the Meiji period. Other industries include food processing, metals and transportation equipment. Automobile parts manufacturer Jatco is headquartered in Fuji. Agriculture in the area is concentrated on green tea production and horticulture.

Education
Fuji has 27 public elementary schools and 16 public Junior high school operated by the city government. The city has four public high schools operated by the Shizuoka Prefectural Board of Education and one public high school operated by the city government. The city has one private high school and one private combined middle/high school. In addition, the prefecture operates one special education school for the disabled.

The city has one international school (Escola Fuji), a Brazilian primary school

In addition, Shizuoka-based Tokoha University has a secondary campus in Fuji.

The city has one public and four private vocational education schools, including the privately operated Fuji Rehabilitation Institute.

Transport

Railways

 Central Japan Railway Company -  Tōkaidō Shinkansen
 
 Central Japan Railway Company -  Tōkaidō Main Line
  -  -  - 
 Central Japan Railway Company -  Minobu Line
 Fuji Station -  -  -  - 
  Gakunan Railway Line
  -  -  -  -  -  -  -  -  -

Highways
  Tōmei Expressway
  Shin-Tōmei Expressway
 Nishi-Fuji Road

Ports
 Tagonoura Port

Local attractions
 Sengen Kofun, a National Historic Site

Festivals

 The Bishamonten Festival is one of the three big Daruma festivals in Japan.
 The Yoshiwara Gion Festival is held on the second Saturday and Sunday of June.
 The Fuji Festival is held on the fourth Saturday of July.
 The Karigane Festival is held on the first Saturday of October.
 The Fuji Shibazakura Festival

Notable people from Fuji
Yoji Totsuka - scientist
Mitsuru Sugaya - manga artist
Makoto Oishi - professional wrestler
Yoshikatsu Kawaguchi - professional soccer player
Takuro Kikuoka - professional soccer player
Daigo Kobayashi - professional soccer player
Shuji Kondo - professional wrestler
Yukihiko Sato - professional soccer player
Hiroyuki Shirai - professional soccer player
Tatsuya Tsuruta - professional soccer player
Urara Ashikawa - professional artistic gymnast

Sister city
 - Oceanside, California, United States.

References

External links
  

 
Cities in Shizuoka Prefecture
Port settlements in Japan
Populated coastal places in Japan